Karl Hagenauer (1898–1956) was an influential Austrian designer in the Art Deco style.

Goldsmith. Carl Hagenauer founded what became the Werkstätte Hagenauer Wien in 1898.  His oldest son, Karl, who would eventually assume leadership of the family business, enrolled at the Vienna School of Applied Arts at age eleven.  There he studied with Josef Hoffmann and Oskar Strnad and created designs for the Wiener Werkstätte art collective. After wartime service in the infantry, he resumed his training and qualified as an architect.  He joined the family business in 1919.

Hagenauer was responsive to the change in public taste influenced by the popularity of the Vienna Secession.  His stylized animals and whimsical creatures handcrafted in brass had broad appeal in domestic and American markets.  Some were useful, such as mirrors, cigar cutters, ashtrays, candlesticks, bookends, hood ornaments and lamp bases.  Other larger sculptures in wood and metal (such as the iconic Josephine Baker in the collection of the Casa Lis Art Nouveau and Art Deco Museum in Salamanca) were purely decorative.

Hagenauer's work was presented at the 1925 Paris Exposition, where he won a bronze and a silver medal.

He designed the company’s trademark “wHw” (for Werkstätte Hagenauer Wien) and registered it in 1927.  The first catalogue to use the trademark dates to 1928, the year his father died and Hagenauer assumed leadership of the business. While Hagenauer was the principal designer of everyday objects (and some sculptures), his younger brother Franz specialized in sculpture.  The company later also produced furniture, chiefly designed by Julius Jirasek.

Hagenauer's work found an avid American market partly through the efforts of New York gallery owner Rena Rosenthal, who featured the Josephine Baker sculpture in a 1935 window display.  Rosenthal's patronage was critical to the post-war success of the Werkstätte Hagenauer; the hostilities caused a delay of several years in her payment for a last container of products shipped in 1938 and the subsequent change in exchange rate was very advantageous to the Austrian craftsman, supporting rebuilding efforts.

Awards 

 1923  Prima Mostra Biennale Internazionale delle Arti Decorative, Monza  (Diploma)
 1925  Exposition Internationale des Arts Décoratifs et Industriels Modernes, Paris (Silver and Bronze medal)
 1927  World's Fair, Philadelphia  (Gold medal)
 1929  International Exhibition, Barcelona
 1930  Triennale, Monza
 1934  Austrian State Prize
 1937  World Fair, Paris (Grand Prix)
 1951  Triennale, Milan (two Gold medals and a Silver medal)

Literature

References

1898 births
1956 deaths
Austrian artists
Art Deco sculptors